Baikonur Site 31, also known as Site 31/6 at the Baikonur Cosmodrome, in Kazakhstan, is a launch site used by derivatives of the R-7 Semyorka missile. From 2011 onwards, it was supposed to be the launch site for crewed Soyuz missions to the International Space Station, when launches switched from the Soyuz-FG launch vehicle to the Soyuz-2, which was unable to use the launch pad at Site 1/5. However, Site 1/5 has undergone modifications that allow the crewed ISS missions to be launched from it. Only a few crewed missions to the International Space Station (ISS) are launched from Site 31/6 (Soyuz TMA-06M, Soyuz TMA-15M, Soyuz MS-02), when Site 1/5 is unavailable.

It was first used on 14 January 1961, for an R-7A ICBM test mission. It is currently used for commercial Soyuz-FG/Fregat missions, and Soyuz-2 launches. In the 1970s and early 1980s, several crewed missions were launched from the site.

See also 

 Gagarin's Start (Baikonur Site 1)

References

Further reading 
 J. K. Golovanov, "Korolev: Facts and myths", Nauka, 1994, ;
 "Rockets and people" – B. E. Chertok, M: "mechanical engineering", 1999  ;
 «A breakthrough in space» - Konstantin Vasilyevich Gerchik, M: LLC "Veles", 1994 - ;
 "Testing of rocket and space technology - the business of my life" Events and facts - A.I. Ostashev, Korolyov, 2001 ;
 "Baikonur. Korolev. Yangel" - M. I. Kuznetsk, Voronezh: IPF "Voronezh", 1997, ;
 "Look back and look ahead. Notes of a military engineer" - Rjazhsky A. A., 2004, SC. first, the publishing house of the "Heroes of the Fatherland" .
 "Rocket and space feat Baikonur" - Vladimir Порошков, the "Patriot" publishers 2007. 
 "Unknown Baikonur" - edited by B. I. Posysaeva, M.: "globe", 2001. 

Baikonur Cosmodrome